Field Rexx is the second studio album by Blitzen Trapper.  It was "made in the sweltering summer of 2004 with no budget amidst the hiss of flies and tape."

Track listing
Preview This Album

References

2004 albums
Blitzen Trapper albums